Colleville-sur-Mer (literally Colleville on Sea) is a commune in the Calvados department in Normandie region in northwestern France.

History 
It was originally a farm owned by a certain Koli, a Scandinavian settler in the Middle Ages. It shares the same etymology as the other Colleville in Normandy. During the conquest of England by William the Conqueror or following it, Gilbert de Colleville was given lands in England, it was from this Knight that the modern de Colville/Colvin/(Calvin in France,) family would develop, also  including Clan Colville in Scotland and the Barony de Colville, of Castle Bytham in England.

The beach next to the coastal village was one of the principal beachheads during the Normandy landings on 6 June 1944, designated Omaha Beach.

Population

Sights

 Normandy American Cemetery and Memorial is located in Colleville-sur-Mer.
 Notre-Dame de l'Assomption de Colleville: dated to the 12th or 13th century, a historical monument since 1840.
 Overlord Museum is located in Colleville-sur-Mer.

See also
Colleville-Montgomery
Communes of the Calvados department

References

External links

 American D-Day: Omaha Beach, Utah Beach & Pointe du Hoc
 Aerial movie of Colleville-sur-Mer, Omaha Beach and the American Cemetery – Film taken from a low flying propeller plane. British Tours.
 How to visit Colleville-sur-Mer in one day from Paris.

Communes of Calvados (department)
Calvados communes articles needing translation from French Wikipedia
Populated coastal places in France